Carl or Karl Ols(s)on or Olsen may refer to:

 Bobo Olson (1928–2002), boxer
 Carl Olson (drag racer), American Top Fuel drag racer
 Carl E. Olson (born 1969), American non-fiction author
 Carl G. Olson (1904-1965), American farmer and politician
 Carl Marcus Olson (1911–2011), credited as the discoverer of the process to make silicon pure
 Karl Olson (1930–2010), baseball player
 Carl Olsson (disambiguation)
 Carl Olsen (cyclist) (1893–1968), Norwegian Olympic cyclist
 Carl B. Olsen (1904–1998), American admiral
 Karl Olsen (1910–1999), Norwegian civil servant